Trema cannabina is a tree found in Southeast Asia and Oceania. They are perennial. It is found in sandy, well drained soil. It also goes by the names of lesser Trema and poison peach, and in the Samoan language . The plant may release an obnoxious odour.

Description 
Trema cannabina grows around 6 metres tall. It can attain a DBH of up to 30 cm. The flowers are small and white. Fruits are 2 to 3 mm tall and wide. Leaves can range anywhere from 4.3 to 16 cm long and 1.1 to 5.8 wide.

Habitat 
Trema cannabina is native to Southeast Asia and Oceania. It can grown in lowland and upland forests from sea level to around 950 metres.

Uses 
Trema cannabina can be used in papers and ropes using the fibres. Using the oil it makes, the fern can also be used to make soaps and lubricants. It may have medicinal purposes.

References

External links
 
 
 View a map of recorded sightings of Trema cannabina at the Australasian Virtual Herbarium
 See images of Trema cannabina on Flickriver

Cannabaceae
Taxobox binomials not recognized by IUCN